Kennebec Bridge may refer to these bridges crossing the Kennebec River:
 Kennebec Memorial Bridge (Augusta, Maine)
 Maine Kennebec Bridge (Richmond-Dresden, Maine)
 Pearl Harbor Remembrance Bridge (Gardiner-Randolph, Maine)
 Calumet Bridge at Old Fort Western (Augusta, Maine)
 Sagadahoc Bridge (Bath-Woolwich, Maine)